The Seleucid army was the army of the Seleucid Empire, one of the numerous Hellenistic states that emerged after the death of Alexander the Great.

As with the other major Hellenistic armies, the Seleucid army fought primarily in the Greco-Macedonian style, with its main body being the phalanx. The phalanx was a large, dense formation of men armed with small shields and a long pike called the sarissa. This form of fighting had been developed by the Macedonian army in the reign of Philip II of Macedon and his son Alexander the Great. Alongside the phalanx, the Seleucid armies used a great deal of native and mercenary troops to supplement their Greek forces, which were limited due to the distance from the Seleucid rulers' Macedonian homeland.

Manpower
The distance from Greece put a strain on the Seleucid military system, as it was primarily based around the recruitment of Greeks as the key segment of the army. In order to increase the population of Greeks in their kingdom, the Seleucid rulers created military settlements. There were two main periods in the establishment of settlements, firstly under Seleucus I Nicator and Antiochus I Soter and then under Antiochus IV Epiphanes. The military settlers were given land, "varying in size according to rank and arm of service'. They were settled in 'colonies of an urban character, which at some point could acquire the status of a polis". Unlike the Ptolemaic military settlers, who were known as Kleruchoi, the Seleucid settlers were called Katoikoi. The settlers would maintain the land as their own and in return they would serve in the Seleucid army when called. The majority of settlements were concentrated in Lydia, northern Syria, the upper Euphrates and Media. The Greeks were dominant in Lydia, Phrygia and Syria. For example, Antiochus III brought Greeks from Euboea, Crete and Aetolia and settled them in Antioch.

These Greek settlers would be used to form the Seleucid phalanx and cavalry units, with picked men put into the kingdom's guards regiments. The rest of the Seleucid army would consist of a large number of native and mercenary troops, who would serve as light auxiliary troops. The government was leery of training and trusting non-Greek soldiers "too much" though, for fear of revolts against Greek rule.  One of the most detailed reports of Seleucid manpower is from the historian Polybius, who recorded in detail units in a military parade in 166–165 BC at Daphne, near its capital Antioch.  At the Daphne Parade, it was largely trusted Greek soldiers capable of being deployed anywhere on display, rather than "ethnic" contingents. This was most likely due to the army reform that was undertaken by Antiochus IV. In his reign, Antiochus IV had built 15 new cities "and their association with the increased phalanx... at Daphne is too obvious to be ignored".

Infantry

Argyraspides

The principle guard infantry of the Seleucid army was the 'Silver-Shields', or Argyraspides. They were a permanently embodied guard unit, which was formed from the sons of military settlers. They were armed in the Macedonian manner with a sarissa and fought in the phalanx formation, much like the other Hellenistic armies of the time. The Argyraspides were probably a corps of about 10,000 men who were picked from the entire kingdom to serve in this unit. The whole kingdom may mean 'regions like Syria and Mesopotamia, which were the nucleus of the Seleucid Kingdom, there was a greater density of Greek soldiers'.

'Romanized' infantry
In 166 BC, at the Daphne Parade under Antiochus IV, the Argyraspides corps is only seen to be 5,000 strong. However, 5,000 troops armed in the Roman fashion are present and they are described as being in the prime of their life, perhaps denoting their elite nature. It is possible that the missing 5,000 men of the Argyraspides were the 5,000 'Romanized' infantry marching alongside them. The training of a segment of the royal guard in "Roman' methods was probably down to several factors. Firstly, Antiochus IV had 'spent part of his early life in Rome and had acquired rather an excessive admiration for Rome's power and methods". Secondly, the future wars that the Seleucids might be fighting would probably be in the eastern satrapies against mobile enemies and other large areas of land. Training troops in this way would add to the overall efficiency and capability of the army and make it more manoeuvrable. Indeed, the 'Romanized' troops are seen facing the Maccabees at the Battle of Beth Zechariah in 162 BC. Thirdly, the defeat of the Antigonids at the Battle of Pydna in 168 BC was a great culture shock, showing the complete destruction of the Macedonian military system at the hands of the Roman legion.

It has been suggested that the fact that these 5,000 men are marching at the head of the army was meant to show Antiochus IV's intention of reforming the entire Seleucid army along Roman lines, though whether or not this complete reform actually took place is unknown. The true extent of the adoption of Roman techniques is unknown, some have suggested that the infantry are in fact more likely to be Thureophoroi or Thorakitai, troops armed with an oval shield of the Celtic type, a thrusting spear and javelins.

Chrysaspides and Chalkaspides
The majority of the Seleucid phalanx was probably formed by the two corps that are mentioned in the Daphne Parade of 166 BC, namely the 10,000 Chrysaspides (Greek: Χρυσάσπιδες 'Golden-Shields') and the 5,000 Chalkaspides ('Bronze-Shields'). Little else is known specifically about them, although they may have been present at the battle of Beth-Zachariah in 162.

Citizen militia
There was a militia, at least in Syria. They were from the Greek cities who had no specific role within the regular army. We do not find the militias involved in the great campaigns before the general decline of the kingdom, which occurred in the latter half of the second century BC. By then, many important military settlements had fallen to Pergamon and Parthia. In 148 BC, at the Battle of Azotos against the Maccabees, the Seleucid army was called the 'Power of the Cities', probably owing to the high proportion of citizen militia mobilized from the coastal cities. Citizens of Antioch played a major role in the overthrowing of Demetrius II Nicator. Demetrius, having taken the throne, decided to disband the majority of the regular army and reduce its pay by a large amount. In place of the regular army, Demetrius' power rested with his Greek, especially Cretan, mercenaries in what was known as the 'Cretan Tyranny'. Not long after, the majority of the citizen militia was wiped out in Antiochus VII's disastrous Parthian War of 129 BC. The militia were most likely armed and fought in the style of the Thureophoroi.

Allied, vassal and mercenary infantry
Due to the lack of Greeks in the lands of the Seleucid kingdom, the use of allied, vassal and mercenary troops was great. They were often used as light and auxiliary troops, supplementing the phalanx and cavalry. Large numbers of native contingents fought at the Battle of Raphia in 217 BC. Among them were 10,000 Arab infantry, 5,000 Dahai, Carmanians and Cilicians. Certain ethnic contingents, be they vassal or mercenary, were of considerable use. For example, Thracian mercenaries along with Mysian, Cilician, Lycian, and Vassal troops from the mountainous areas of the empire were used by Antiochus III in conjunction with Thorakitai in his storming of the Elburz range in 210 BC. The Persian and Iranian troops were most likely of a higher professional military standing than most of the other contingents, as they are seen on garrison duty throughout the empire. In the review at Daphne in 166 BC, the large numbers of allied and vassal contingents are missing. They were of doubtful reliability, usefulness and efficiency. So much so that Appian blamed them for the defeat at the Battle of Magnesia in 190 BC. The absence of auxiliaries from the army of Antiochus IV may have contributed to its strength. Making up for the loss of ethnic contingents, the army was supplemented by mercenaries, who were more experienced and better trained. The Thracian and Galatian mercenaries at Daphne would have been of good use in campaigns in the rough, hilly terrain. For example, the arms and equipment of the Thracian troops allowed the individual soldier greater mobility and freer action in hand-to-hand combat than a phalangite could adopt.

Cavalry
Unlike the more westerly powers, like the Romans and other Greek states, where infantry dominated the battlefield, in the 'vast spaces to the east, the horse cultures were more influential'. Speed and mobility were the key, especially when dealing with foes like the Parthians and the Greco-Bactrians. The Parthian style of warfare was based around heavily armoured cavalrymen, Cataphracts, and horse archers, which were used in hit and run style tactics. The eastern style of horse warfare would have a deep impact in the reign of Antiochus III, when he armed his heavy cavalry along Parthian lines. However, unfortunately for the Seleucids, their main rivals, the Romans and Ptolemies, used armies that were centered around a core of good infantry. In this sense, there was a sense of the overvaluing of cavalry as an offensive arm. Antiochus III was an excellent cavalry commander, his assault at Tapuria in 208 BC as described by Polybius could almost act as a 'military treatise on how to conduct a cavalry battle'. However, Antiochus III was not as apt when dealing with infantry, be it Greek or Roman. At Magnesia, Antiochus' disregard for his phalanx and his misdirected cavalry charge led to his defeat. The Seleucid cavalry, after the introduction of the Cataphract, can be sub-divided into several categories. Firstly, there were the heavy cavalry of which there were Kataphraktoi (armoured) and Aphraktoi (unarmoured). The Aphraktoi were divided into two groups, lancer and missile troops. The lancers, who performed the job of heavy cavalry before the Cataphract, were known by numerous names, for example dorataphoroi, sarissaphoroi, kontophoroi, xystophoroi and lonchophoroi. Xystophoroi and lonchophoroi were mentioned specifically by Titus Flamininus whilst in discussion with the Achaeans. The light cavalry was used to skirmish, so troops such as those that fought in the Tarentine style were common within this category, although there were numerous native contingents too.

Agema, Hetairoi and Nisaioi

Along with the guard infantry unit, there were two guard cavalry regiments, each 1,000 strong. These were the Agema (the 'Guards') and the Hetairoi ('Companions'). The Hetairoi were recruited from the younger generation of military settlers and acted as the standing guard cavalry unit of the army, serving in peace and in war. However, it seems that writers referred to them by several names other than just the 'companions'; the basilike ile ('royal squadron' or 'regia ala' according to Livy), and the hippos hetairike ('horse companions'). Bar-Kochva presumes that from this their full title may well have been the 'royal ala of the companions'. The Agema 'consisted of Medes, selected men, with a mixture of horsemen of many races from the same part of the world. Both corps of cavalry could escort the king into battle, or both could be brigaded together into one unit of 2,000. Both units were armed with a xyston, a cavalry lance not so dissimilar to the sarissa. They were also equipped with a cuirass and helmet. After the introduction of the Cataphract, the Hetairoi were given similar but lighter protection. As for the Agema, they were probably equipped the same as the cataphracts. Another regiment of horse that was similarly armed to the cataphracts was the Nisian cavalry (Nisaioi), which was composed of Iranians.

Epilektoi
At the Daphne parade, there was also a regiment of 'picked', known as Epilektoi, horsemen, numbering 1,000. The Epilektoi were most likely recruited from the city of Larissa, which was founded by colonists from Larissa on the Greek mainland. After the loss of Media, the main recruiting ground for the Agema, to the Parthians, the Epilektoi were given the title and role of the Agema by Alexander Balas.

Kataphraktoi

Despite the prospect of a mobile cavalry phalanx, the cavalry still faced problems. The xyston was still too short to meet the sarissa phalanx head on. The weight of their armour restricted movement, but the elimination of a shield for protection made the rider and horse more vulnerable. The desire to meet the phalanx head on and the need for protection was remedied after the anabasis of Antiochus III to the eastern satrapies in 210-206 BC. At this time, Antiochus came into contact with the Parthian cavalry, of which some were heavily armed with scale armour for both the rider and horse and longer lances known as a kontos. The kontos 'almost equalled the phalangite sarissa'. The cataphract had numerous advantages though. First, their armour provided protection from missiles, arrows, spears and pikes. Second, the kontos allowed them to block an enemy advance and attack from further away. For example, the Seleucid cataphracts were able to beat the Ptolemaic cavalry and attack their phalanx at Panium in 200 BC with relative ease. Nevertheless, they still had their problems. Like the phalanx, an attack on their flank could prove fatal for the rider and these difficulties were exploited by infantry 'which assaulted the cataphracts from the flanks, attacking body parts of the riders and horses that were unprotected by armour'. The cataphracts could also have their kontos grabbed from them or be knocked off their horse. In order to remedy this, semi-heavy cavalry were needed to watch their flanks.

While the Seleucid cataphracts were certainly of Greek or Persian descent, Livy describes a contingent of 3,000 cavalry "clad in mail armour and known as 'cataphracti'" present at the Battle of Magnesia, standing next to a contingent of Galatian infantry, which Appian later also describe being of Galatian descent.

Politikoi
Along with the citizen militia infantry, there were also militia cavalry units recruited in the cities, known as Politikoi. This cavalry consisted of those richest citizens who did not hold the legal status of 'Macedonians'. Citizen cavalry of this sort was seen at the Daphne parade and, in this case, was probably just from Antioch and not collected from all of the coastal cities. The Politikoi was probably not organised into regiments; instead, it was likely that it comprised a collection of separate squadrons, with each squadron having its own distinctive dress and equipment.

Tarantine cavalry
The Seleucids employed a number of Tarantine cavalry, either as mercenaries or – more likely – equipped and trained in the "Tarantine fashion". They were present at the Battle of Panium and the Battle of Magnesia.

Dromedaries
Camels are attested in use in the Seleucid army at the battle of Magnesia, but their small number (500) suggests they were not a regular addition. According to Xenophon, their scent scared off horses.

Allied, vassal and mercenary cavalry
The Seleucids fielded several types of mercenary, vassal and allied cavalry. At the Battle of Magnesia Antiochus deployed Dahae horse archers, Gallograecian (Galatian) cavalry and camel-borne Arab archers. Appian later also identifies Mysian and Elymais horse archers in that battle, which Livy said to be foot archers.

Decline
Despite the numerous advantages that the Seleucids had at the height of their power, the empire soon began to fall into decline, especially with the coming of so many dynastic wars between the rival claimants to the Seleucid throne. The Romans, increasingly after the death of Antiochus IV, supported those claimants who they felt would be weak and no threat to them. The Roman senate supported the young and weak Antiochus V over the stronger and more capable Demetrius, who was a hostage in Rome at the time. When Demetrius took the throne as Demetrius I, Rome further undermined him by supporting Alexander Balas and numerous rebel groups, such as those of John Hyrcanus in Judea. The ever weakening empire led to the Parthians' sweeping into and taking over their eastern satrapies. These conquests took place at the same time as the bitter civil wars in the empire. There was a moment of success and strength with the Parthian campaign of Antiochus VII, but his death in battle led to further defeat and decline. The loss of these territories meant the loss of vital economic and manpower resources. By the beginning of the 1st century BC, the Seleucid kingdom was still troubled by instability caused by civil war between the northern and southern branches of the Seleucid royal household. The loss of manpower and political instability may well have ensured that the Seleucid army was dependent on mercenaries and citizen militias and unable to maintain a phalanx of the size seen at Raphia and Magnesia.

Notes

References
Polybius, Histories
Livy, History of Rome
Appian, Syrian Wars
Astin, A.E., Frederiksen, M.W., Ogilvie, R.M., Walbank, F.W. (eds.) (1984), The Cambridge Ancient History: Volume VII
Beston, Paul (2002), Review, The Classical Review, New Series, Vol.52, No.2, p. 388-389
Chaniotis, Angelos (2006), "War in the Hellenistic World"
Gaebel, Robert E. (2002), Cavalry Operations in the Ancient Greek World
Griffith, G.T. (1935), The Mercenaries of the Hellenistic World
Sekunda, Nick (1994), Seleucid and Ptolemaic Reformed Armies 168-145 BC, Volume 1: The Seleucid Army
Sekunda, Nick (2001), Hellenistic Infantry Reform in the 160's BC
Schwerin-White, Susan, & Kuhrt, Amelie (1993), From Samarkhand to Sardis: A new approach to the Seleucid Empire
Bar-Kochva, Bezalel (1979), The Seleucid Army: Organization and Tactics in the Great Campaigns

Head, Duncan (1982), Armies of the Macedonian and Punic Wars 359 BC to 146 BC
Bevan, Edwyn Robert, (1902), The House of Seleucus, Vol. II
Tarn, W.W. (1980), The Greeks in Bactria and India

Military history of the Seleucid Empire
Hellenistic armies